Artem Gostyev (born 20 December 1972, Kharkiv) is a Ukrainian designer, director and colorist. Author of the visual identity of a number of national Ukrainian TV channels, logo and style of the news program Television Service of News. In the past, head of the creative department of Inter Media Group holding.

Early life 
Artem Gostyev was born on December 20, 1972 in Kharkiv.

He graduated from the Kharkiv State Academy of Design and Arts (“red diploma”), faculty of “Graphic Design” (1994—1999). He is a graphic designer by profession. The diploma work (“Printing house of color on the example of the Ukrainian alphabet”, 1999) was praised by the state examination commission.

He is a graduate student of postgraduate studies at the Higher School of Pedagogy in Warsaw, majoring in “Pedagogy and Digital Technologies”, 2021—2022.

Career 
He was at the origins of the design of television content and advertising, commercial TV in Ukraine, design of programs for the TV channels Privat-TV and Simon (1994—1999).

He worked for two years as an art director at a television production company in Riyadh, the capital of Saudi Arabia.

In 2004—2009, he was the senior designer of the 1+1 TV channel.  Artem Gostyev created the logo and style of the Television Service of News news program, which remains unchanged to this day. He was also the author of the stylistic rebranding of the national channel 1+1. The main colors became red and white, instead of the former blue.

Artem Gostyev's personal works were twice awarded the Promax Awards (2007—2009). Among them is the brand-book of Cinema TV channel (now 2+2), which won the Promax Awards in 2007. For the first time in the entire history of television, the design of the Ukrainian channel was marked at the level of the world's leading channels among such giants as BBC, CNN, MTV.

In 2009—2011, he was the head of the creative projects department of the Inter Media Group holding. Artem Gostyev created and aired the design of TV channels: Inter, NTN, K1, K2, Enter-film, Pixel TV.

During his career, he also created logos, style and content design for other Ukrainian TV channels: 1+1, Espreso TV, Cinema, Business, UBR, ZIK. The musical design of most of the visual identifications was created in cooperation with Ihor Melnychuk and Pavlo Krakhmalyov (Braty Hadiukiny group).

In 2011, he was the author of the design of the Teletriumph award.

At the invitation of the director Andrei Zagdansky, as a colorist, he participated in the creation of the documentary film My Father Evgeni, which won numerous prizes in Europe and America (2010).

In 2012—2014, Gostyev was the creative director of the UBR TV channel.

In 2015—2022, he was the art director of the GoodMedia advertising and event agency. As an art director of the agency, he participated in the creation of a series of social videos about the Ukrainian army Airport, You are near, We believe, We live, which won silver and bronze at the Omni Awards in 2015. He also took part in the design of the documentary Battle for the Dnipro (2014).

For the Eurovision Song Contest 2017, he created a full cycle of the all-Ukrainian sponsorship company, from key-visual to video clips, and was also the director of a number of musical business cards for the contest.

In 2020, he created the brand book of the Ukrainian political party Servant of the People. He is the author of the logo and style of the Ukrainian military run Military Run UA.

Personal life 
Father — Borys Dmytrovych Gostyev, designer, glass artist. In the past, a member of the All-Union Art Council;
Mother is an economist;
Wife — Maria Gostyeva, Ukrainian designer, art director. The founder of the advertising event agency Art-Leo (Poland);
Daughter — Anastasia, Ukrainian designer, director, blogger, linguist, expert on South Korean culture;
Son — Leo.

References 

Living people
People from Kharkiv
1972 births
Ukrainian directors
Ukrainian designers